(Latin for "on the word of no one" or "take nobody's word for it") is the motto of the Royal Society. John Evelyn and other fellows of the Royal Society chose the motto soon after the Society's founding in 1660.

Meaning and etymology
The Royal Society website says that the motto is "an expression of the determination of Fellows to withstand the domination of authority and to verify all statements by an appeal to facts determined by experiment."

The phrase comes from Horace's Epistle to his benefactor Maecenas, where he claims not to be devoted to any particular sect but is rather an eclectic by nature. The motto was extracted from the first of two hexameters, as indicated in bold:

 ("(being) not obliged to swear in words (allegiance) to a master, wherever the storm drags me, I am turned in as a guest.")

Using macrons to indicate long vowels, the phrase can be written as Nūllīus in verba, where the stress accent in Nūllīus appears on the second-to-last syllable due to the long ī.

The minor planet known as 11059 Nulliusinverba in the asteroid belt is named after the expression. The phrase is also widely used and cited elsewhere.

References

External link

History of the Royal Society
Latin philosophical phrases
Latin_mottos
Skepticism
Horace